Classical theism is a form of theism in which God is characterized as the absolutely metaphysically ultimate being, in contrast to other conceptions such as pantheism, panentheism, polytheism, deism and process theism.

Classical theism is a form of monotheism. Whereas most monotheists agree that God is, at minimum, all-knowing, all-powerful, and completely good, classical theism asserts that God is both immanent (encompassing or manifested in the material world) and simultaneously transcendent (independent of the material universe); simple, and having such attributes as immutability, impassibility, and timelessness. A key concept in classical theism is that "created beings" (ie, material phenomena, whether sentient biological organisms or insentient matter) are dependent for their existence on the one supreme divine Being. Also, although God is wholly transcendent, he not only creates the material universe but also acts upon the material universe in imposing (or organizing) a Higher Order upon that material reality. This order was called by the ancient Greeks logos.

Classical theism is associated with the tradition of writers like Plato, Aristotle, Philo of Alexandria, Plotinus, Proclus, Athenagoras of Athens, Clement of Alexandria, Basil of Caesarea, Augustine, Boethius, Cyril of Alexandria, John Damascene, Pseudo-Dionysius the Areopagite, Al-Kindi, Al-Farabi, Avicenna, Anselm of Canterbury, Maimonides, Averroes, Thomas Aquinas, Leibniz. Since the advent of the scientific revolution in the seventeenth century the principle of divine immanence as a central doctrine of classical theism (as traditionally held by all three of the major Abrahamic religions) began to be replaced among progressive thinkers with the notion that although God had created the universe in the beginning he subsequently left the universe to run according to fixed laws of nature. A common metaphor for this idea in the seventeenth century was that of the clockwork universe. This theological doctrine was known as deism and gradually became the default view of many of the influential thinkers of the eighteenth century enlightenment.

Among modern day theologians and philosophers of religion classical theism has appeared in a number of variants. For example, there are, today, philosophers like Alvin Plantinga (who rejects divine simplicity), Richard Swinburne (who rejects divine timelessness) and William Lane Craig (who rejects both divine simplicity and timelessness), who can be viewed as theistic personalists. Philosophers like David Bentley Hart and Edward Feser have defended traditional classical theism in recent times.

Notes

References
 
 
 

Philosophy of religion
Theism